Nornicotine is an alkaloid found in various plants including Nicotiana, the tobacco plant. It is chemically similar to nicotine, but does not contain a methyl group.

It is a precursor to the carcinogen N-nitrosonornicotine that is produced during the curing and processing of tobacco. Nornicotine can react in human saliva to form N-nitrosonornicotine, a known type 1 carcinogen.

Synthesis 
There are several routes for the synthesis of nornicotine. One route is the demethylation of nicotine, which can be accomplished by reaction with silver oxide.

  

Another route is the partial reduction of 3-myosmine, which can be accomplished by standard catalytic hydrogenation conditions using palladium as a catalyst or with sodium borohydride. This reaction gives the racemic product.

Pharmacology 
Nornicotine possess high affinity for alpha-6 and alpha-7 subunits of nAChRs. It also inhibits DAT in striatum via nAChR and releases dopamine in rats.

References 

Pyridine alkaloids
Pyrrolidines
Alkaloids found in Nicotiana
3-Pyridyl compounds